San Felipe is a town and municipality located in the Guainía Department, Republic of Colombia.

References

Municipalities of Guainía Department